Evani Soares da Silva Calado (born 29 November 1989 in São Paulo) is a Brazilian Paralympic boccia player . 
She won a gold medal at the 2016 Summer Paralympics in Rio de Janeiro, in bocce BC3 mixed doubles, with Antônio Leme and Evelyn de Oliveira .

She competed at the 2020 Summer Paralympics, in Boccia Individual BC3, and Boccia Pairs BC3.

References 

Living people
1989 births
People from Garanhuns
Paralympic boccia players of Brazil
Boccia players at the 2016 Summer Paralympics
Boccia players at the 2020 Summer Paralympics
Medalists at the 2016 Summer Paralympics
Paralympic gold medalists for Brazil